The following lists events that happened during 1997 in Rwanda.

Incumbents 
 President: Pasteur Bizimungu 
 Prime Minister: Pierre-Célestin Rwigema

Events

January
 January 18 - In northwest Rwanda, Hutu militia members kill 6 Spanish aid workers, 3 soldiers, and seriously wound another.

References

 
1990s in Rwanda
Years of the 20th century in Rwanda
Rwanda
Rwanda